Victoire tram stop is located on line  of the tramway de Bordeaux.

Situation
The station is located at the Place de la Victoire in Bordeaux.

Junctions

Réseau TBC
 Réseau -Bus-

Réseau Trans Gironde

Close by 
 Place de la Victoire (Porte d'Aquitaine et Colonne)
 Université Bordeaux 2 (Sociologie, Psychologie, Odontologie)
 Rue Sainte-Catherine, plus grande rue piétonne d'Europe
 Parking Victoire

See also 
 TBC
 Tramway de Bordeaux

External links 
 

Bordeaux tramway stops
Tram stops in Bordeaux
Railway stations in France opened in 2004